Dimitri V. Nanopoulos (born 13 September 1948) is a Greek physicist. He is one of the most regularly cited researchers in the world, cited more than 48,500 times across a number of separate branches of science.

Biography
Dimitri Nanopoulos was born and raised in Athens. His grandfather, Dimitris Nakas, was an Aromanian and an ardent Greek nationalist who had migrated at the beginning of the 20th century to New York, but in March 1914 traveled back to his native land in order to participate in the Greek struggle for northern Epirus, and died in 1916; Nanopoulos' father was born nine months prior. His father's name was Vaios. His mother, Vasiliki Korasidi, was born in Kifissia but descended from the Greek island of Kea. Nanopoulos studied Physics at the University of Athens and he graduated in 1971, continuing his studies at the University of Sussex in England, where he obtained his Ph.D. in 1973 in High Energy Physics. He has been a Research Fellow at the European Organization for Nuclear Research (CERN) in Geneva, Switzerland and for many years has been a staff member and Research Fellow at the École Normale Supérieure, in Paris, France and at Harvard University, Cambridge, United States. In 1989, he was elected Professor at the Department of Physics, at the NASA-supported Texas A&M University, where since 1992 he has been a Distinguished Professor of Physics, and since 2002 holder of the Mitchell/Heep Chair in High Energy Physics; he is also a distinguished HARC fellow at the Houston Advanced Research Center in Houston, Texas. In 1997 he was appointed regular member of the Academy of Athens, and, in 2005, President of the Greek National Council for Research and Technology, Greek National Representative to the European Laboratory for Particle Physics, CERN, and to the European Space Agency (ESA).

He has made several contributions to particle physics and cosmology, and works in string unified theories, fundamentals of quantum theory, astroparticle physics and quantum-inspired models of brain function. He has written over 645 original papers, including 14 books. He has over 42,500 citations, placing him as the fourth most cited High Energy Physicist of all time, according to the 2001 and 2004 census. Since 1988 he has been fellow of the American Physical Society, and since 1992 member of the Italian Physical Society. In 1996, he was made Commander of the Order of Honour of the Greek State. 
 
He is one of the principal developers of the flipped SU(5) model, first proposed by Stephen M. Barr in a paper published in 1982. It was further described in a 1984 paper by Nanopoulos, J. P. Deredinger, and J.E Kim and a 1987 paper by Nanopoulos, I. Antoniadis, John Ellis, and John Hagelin.

On 17 October 2006 he was awarded the Onassis International prize by the Alexander S. Onassis Foundation. On 28 September 2009, he was awarded the 2009 Enrico Fermi Prize from the Italian Physical Society in recognition of his pioneering work in the field of string theory.

See also
 Quantum Aspects of Life

References

External links
Role of Nanopoulos in naming GUT
Dimitri Nanopoulos and the speed of light
Scientific publications of Dimitri Nanopoulos on INSPIRE-HEP

1948 births
Alumni of the University of Sussex
People associated with CERN
Commanders of the Order of Honour (Greece)
Fellows of the American Physical Society
Greek emigrants to the United States
20th-century Greek physicists
Greek people of Aromanian descent
Harvard University faculty
Living people
Members of the Academy of Athens (modern)
National and Kapodistrian University of Athens alumni
Scientists from Athens
String theorists
Texas A&M University faculty
Theoretical physicists